Carlos Gustavo dos Anjos (born 1 September 1956) is a São Toméan diplomat. He was Foreign Minister from April 2006, when the government of Prime Minister Tomé Vera Cruz took office, until he was replaced by Ovídio Manuel Barbosa Pequeno on November 20, 2007.

On October 2, 2009, he was ambassador to the European Union.

Other than Portuguese and Creole, he is fluent in English, Spanish, French, and Italian.

References 

1956 births
Living people
Foreign Ministers of São Tomé and Príncipe
Ambassadors of São Tomé and Príncipe to the European Union
21st-century São Tomé and Príncipe politicians